The Warwick Line (also known as the Warwick–Yorktown line) was a defensive works across the Virginia Peninsula maintained along the Warwick River by Confederate General John B. Magruder against much larger Union forces under General George B. McClellan during the American Civil War in 1861–62.

The main line extended 12 miles from Yorktown to the Warwick River and downstream to Lee's Mill, then westward to Skiffe's Creek, which flowed into the James River at Mulberry Island, where the line was anchored on the east by a four-gun battery at Mulberry Island Point. The south end of Mulberry Island (now part of Fort Eustis) is located at the confluence of the Warwick and James Rivers.

Notes

See also
Dam No. One Battlefield Site
Fort Crafford
Lee's Mill Earthworks
Queen Hith Plantation Complex Site
Southern Terminal Redoubt

Virginia in the American Civil War
History of Newport News, Virginia